Al-Khulafa Mosque is a historic Sunni Islamic mosque located in Baghdad, Iraq.

The mosque dates back to the Abbasid era and was commissioned by the 17th Abbasid Caliph, al-Muktafi, as a Friday mosque for the sprawling palace complex erected by him and his father, al-Mu'tadid. Due to this, the mosque is often also called as Al-Qasr Mosque which literally means the "mosque of the palace" in Arabic. Later the mosque was dubbed as the Mosque of Caliph, which gave the current name Al-Khulafa. The mosque is one of the historic landmarks of the city of Baghdad. The mosque was mentioned in the Ibn Battuta’s travel record when he visited Baghdad in 1327.

The most notable part of the mosque is its  minaret which is still surviving on its original form dating back to the Abbasid era. The minaret is the only part remaining from the original construction. It is set on the southeast corner of the sahn and constructed in brick and mortar. The minaret and its foundation are decorated with muqarnas, and the frame of the minaret is engraved with Kufic inscriptions and Islamic geometric patterns. The minaret was refurbished in 1960. However, today there is a concern of its collapsing due to the lack of maintenance allegedly stemming from the sectarian divide between the Sunni-oriented mosque and the Shia-majority government. Because of the minaret's tilt, the mosque is better known by locals as "al'ahdab", meaning "the hunchback".

See also

 Islam in Iraq
 List of mosques in Iraq

References

10th-century mosques
Mosques in Baghdad
Abbasid architecture
Sunni mosques in Iraq